Financial Bank Benin is a commercial bank in Benin. It is a member of the West African Bankers' Association.

It has its headquarters in Cotonou but also has branches in cities such as Parakou. The bank is dominated by Swiss ownership, with Financial BC in Geneva having an 85% share, Aiglon S.A. in Geneva with 15%  and private French shares (0.01%).

The bank has a 25% share in the Benin microfinance group Finadev.

References

Banks of Benin
Companies based in Cotonou